The following is a list of all team-to-team transactions that have occurred in the National Hockey League during the 1973–74 NHL season.  It lists what team each player has been traded to, signed by, or claimed by, and for which players or draft picks, if applicable.

Trades

May 

 Trade completed on July 27, 1973.

June

July

August

September

October

November

December

January

February

March 

 Trade completed on May 24, 1974.

Additional sources
 

Transactions
National Hockey League transactions